Jugjugg Jeeyo is a 2022 Indian Hindi-language family comedy-drama film directed by Raj Mehta and produced by Dharma Productions and Viacom18 Studios. The film stars Neetu Kapoor, Anil Kapoor, Varun Dhawan, Kiara Advani, Manish Paul and debutante Prajakta Koli.

Jugjugg Jeeyo was released on 24 June 2022 and received mixed-to-positive reviews from critics.

Plot  
Kuldeep "Kukoo" Saini and Nainaa Sharma marry each other, having loved each other ever since they had gone to school together. The couple relocate to Toronto, Canada for Nainaa's job in a corporate company while Kukoo is employed as a bouncer in a nightclub. Within five years, the couple's marital life gets strained due to prolonged silences, unfinished conversations and resentful hearts while Nainaa is offered a new position as the vice-president of HR at New York City and Kukoo is frustrated with his job. On their wedding anniversary, Nainaa and Kukoo confess to each other about their stressed marital life and plan to divorce each other once Kukoo's sister Ginny is married. They fly to India for attending Ginny's wedding with Baljeet in their hometown Patiala, Punjab and are received by Kukoo's happy parents Bheem and Geeta and Ginny. Nainaa and Kukoo pretend to be happy, unwilling to disturb the vibes of Ginny's marriage while Ginny has conflicted feelings for her former boyfriend, Gaurav instead of Baljeet.

As Nainaa's boss urges her to decide soon about her promotion, she insists Kukoo to reveal about their divorce plan to his parents. Kukoo parties with his father Bheem and tries to tell him about his plans to get separated from Nainaa but rather learns that Bheem intends to divorce Geeta after Ginny's wedding. Puzzled, Kukoo attempts to confront Bheem and is informed of the latter's extra-marital affair with Kukoo's mathematics teacher in 12th grade, Meera. Meanwhile, Nainaa becomes frustrated when the women of the house arrange for a small prayer for her to bear children and angrily discloses about her plans to get separated from Kukoo to her mother and Geeta. Next morning, a shocked Geeta confronts Kukoo and Nainaa and tries convincing them to sort their problems out. Frustrated when Bheem tries to do the same as Geeta, Kukoo reveals Bheem's affair with Meera to Geeta and Nainaa, shattering the former while Bheem fakes a heart stroke to earn sympathy and requests the doctor, their family friend to play along with his act. 

Meanwhile, Geeta plans to unite Bheem and Meera after Ginny's wedding and informs them, Nainaa and Kukoo of the same at a temple much to everyone's despair. Due to Geeta's act, Kukoo picks up an argument with her and Nainaa at home, leaves the house and drinks with Gurpreet, his best friend, confidant and Nainaa's elder brother. At night, Bheem leaves the house to live with Meera but the latter doesn't wish to be with him as she feels that she could never be like Geeta. When Kukoo meets Bheem on the road, the latter pretends to have left Meera for good and realized that Geeta is his better half. Convinced of his act, Geeta forgives Bheem while Ginny, who is unaware of all the drama taking place at her home, arranges for her parents to renew their wedding vows on the occasion of their wedding anniversary. On the day of Geeta and Bheem's re-wedding, Kukoo and Gurpreet call Meera to mock her as Bheem "kicked her out" in favour of Geeta but realize that it was Meera who rejected Bheem. Infuriated by his father, Kukoo discloses it all at the very same time publicly and insults Bheem, for which Geeta slaps Kukoo but ultimately decides to file for a divorce. 

Having learnt of Kukoo and Nainaa's plans of divorce and her parents' conflict, Ginny bursts out about her insecurity in getting married to Baljeet as she still loves someone else while she was all along ready to marry Baljeet as Geeta had once assured her that everything would be right after marriage whereas it did not work out for both the couples. The divorce proceedings begin for both the couples. While Bheem and Geeta are given six months by the court to reconsider, Kukoo refuses to accept for divorce, apologizing to Nainaa for not being part of her success all along and being jealous of it instead. They reconcile and set to leave for New York City while Bheem plans to reconcile with Geeta within these six months, having realized his selfishness and also thinks of getting Ginny married to Gaurav.

Cast

 Neetu Kapoor as Geeta Saini
 Anil Kapoor as Bheem Saini
 Varun Dhawan as Kuldeep "Kukoo" Saini
 Kiara Advani as Naina Sharma Saini
 Manish Paul as Gurpreet Sharma
 Prajakta Koli as Ginny Saini
 Tisca Chopra as Meera Malhotra
Varun Sood as Gaurav Kapoor
Savant Singh Premi as Baljeet "Ballu" Sodhi
Naman Arora as Vishal Verma
 Suparna Marwah as Naina and Gurpreet's mother
 Elnaaz Norouzi in a special appearance song "Duppata"

Production
Principal photography commenced on 16 November 2020 in Chandigarh. The shooting wrapped up in November 2021.

Release
Jugjugg Jeeyo was released in theatres on 24 June 2022 in 3,375 screens with 11,384 shows per day. It premiered digitally on 22 July 2022 on Amazon Prime Video.

Lawsuit
On 21 June 2022, Vishal Singh, a writer from Ranchi, India, accused Karan Johar of plagiarizing the plot for Jugjugg Jeeyo. Singh claimed the story was copied from his story Punny Rani, demanding Rs. 1.5 crores in compensation. As of 23 June 2022, the matter was before a local court.

Soundtrack 

The music of the film is composed by Tanishk Bagchi, Kanishk Seth - Kavita Seth, Diesby, Pozy and Vishal Shelke with lyrics  written by Tanishk Bagchi, Kumaar, Abrar-ul-Haq, Diesby, Shamsher Sandhu, Ginny Diwan, Dhruv Yogi and Ghulam Mohd. Khavar.

The first song, titled "The Punjaabban Song", was recreated by Tanishk Bagchi from the 2002 Pakistani music album Nach Punjaban by Abrar-ul-Haq. 

The second song, "Rangisari", is a re-release of the song "Rangi Saari" by Kavita Seth - Kanishk Seth, recreated from the 
late classical vocalist Shobha Gurtu’s popular thumri. 

The third song, "Duppata", was a recreated version of the 1994 hit Punjabi song Dupatta Tera Satrang Da, composed by Atul Sharma, written by Shamsher Sandhu and sung by Surjit Bindrakhia. The remix version is sung by Diesby, Chapter 6 and Shreya Sharma, with Diesby writing and composing the remix.

The fourth song, "Nain Ta Heere", is an original romantic number sung by Guru Randhawa and Asees Kaur with lyrics by Ghulam Mohd. Khavar translated by Kumaar. The song marks composer Vishal Shelke's debut, and replaced a song "Ik Mulaqaat" originally composed and written by Mithoon, which would have marked the composer's first collaboration with Dharma Productions. A version of the song, released only as Instagram reel audio, was sung by Advani.

Reception

Critical reception
Jugjugg Jeeyo received mixed-to-positive reviews from critics. Taran Adarsh of Bollywood Hungama rated the film 4 out of 5 stars and wrote "Jugjugg Jeeyo balances drama, humour and emotions seamlessly". Ronek Kotecha of The Times Of India rated the film 3.5 out of 5 stars and wrote "Just like its characters, Jugjugg Jeeyo too has its flaws but at the end of the day, it’s all in the family and this is just the kind of wholesome family entertainer". Tushar Joshi of India Today rated the film 3.5 out of 5 stars and wrote "JugJugg Jeeyo’s biggest strength lies in the fact that it is able to showcase the strength of its entire star cast in the best way possible". Zinia Bandyopadhyay of News 18 rated the film 3.5 out of 5 stars and wrote "Jugjugg Jeeyo will make you laugh, cry and join the characters on the emotional roller coaster". Himesh Mankad of Pinkvilla rated the film 3.5 out of 5 stars and wrote "Jug Jugg Jeeyo marries comedy with drama and emotions and is a full on package that will entertain the audience". Sukanya Verna of Rediff rated the film 3 out of 5 stars and wrote "JugJugg Jeeyo is a David Dhawan comedy, not directed by David Dhawan". 

Tina Das of The Print rated the film 3 out of 5 stars and wrote "Comedy is often not a great tool to discuss tense topics, but Anil Kapoor and Neetu Singh's Jugg Jugg Jeeyo passes the test". Shubhra Gupta of The Indian Express rated the film 2.5 out of 5 stars and wrote "JugJugg Jeeyo feels like a set-up for a modern-day dive into post-marriage shenanigans". Saibal Chatterjee of NDTV rated the film 2 out of 5 stars and wrote "Neetu Kapoor strides through the film with striking poise. Full marks to Varun and Kiara for trying to keep up with Anil Kapoor". Anna M. M. Vetticad of Firstpost rated the film 2 out of 5 stars and wrote "Jugjugg Jeeyo's apologetic feminism aims to cater to both feminists and conservatives. As a consequence, it is neither here nor there and may as well be nowhere." Monika Rawal Kukreja of The Hindustan Times stated "Varun Dhawan, Kira Advani, Anil Kapoor and Neetu Kapoor bring a fun family drama to life". Anuj Kumar of The Hindu stated "Director Raj Mehta’s family drama can evoke a few hearty laughs and some animated dinner table discussions, but the movie ends up only scratching the proverbial surface of male entitlement and chauvinism".

Box office 
It earned 9.28 crores at the domestic box office on its opening day. On the second day, the film collected 10.55 crore. On the third day, the film collected 12.10 crore, taking a total domestic opening weekend of 28.93 crore.

References

External links 
 

2020s Hindi-language films
Films shot in Toronto
Films shot in Chandigarh
2022 comedy-drama films